John Gordon Bernander (born 22 September 1957) is a Norwegian politician for the Conservative Party and former director-general of the Norwegian Broadcasting Corporation (NRK) and the Confederation of Norwegian Enterprise.

Early life and career
He was born in New York City, grew up in Brooklyn and Kristiansand. He was educated at the Norwegian Naval Academy in Bergen from 1976 to 1977 and graduated from the University of Oslo with the cand.jur. degree in 1982.

Politics
In 1989 he was elected to the Parliament of Norway from Vest-Agder, but he did not stand for re-election in 1993. From March to November 1990 he was appointed State Secretary in the Ministry of Trade. During this period his seat in Parliament was taken by Kirsten Huser Leschbrandt. Bernander had been a personal secretary (today known as political advisor) in the Ministry of Industry from 1985 to 1986.

On the local level he was a member of Kristiansand city council from 1979 to 1985 and 1987 to 1989, the first period in the executive committee. He chaired the county party chapter from 1988 to 1989. From 1991 to 1994 Bernander was vice-chairman of the nationwide party. He was a member of the nationwide central board from 1988 to 1997.

Business
Before entering politics Bernander worked as a businessman and lawyer. From 1993 to 2001 he was CEO of the Gard P&I Club and later Gard Services in Arendal. From 15 June 2001 to 19 March 2007, Bernander was the director-general (kringkastingssjef) of the Norwegian Broadcasting Corporation, the Norwegian state-owned broadcasting company. He succeeded Einar Førde, and was succeeded by Hans-Tore Bjerkaas. From 2006 to 2007 Bernander was vice president of the European Broadcasting Union.

From May 2007 Bernander is associated with The Mosvold Shipping Group in Kristiansand. From September 2009 to September 2012 he was the director-general of the Confederation of Norwegian Enterprise. He then moved on to the managing director position in Viking Heat Engines.

References

1957 births
Living people
Members of the Storting
Conservative Party (Norway) politicians
Vest-Agder politicians
Norwegian state secretaries
Politicians from Kristiansand
Politicians from Brooklyn
Royal Norwegian Naval Academy alumni
University of Oslo alumni
Norwegian jurists
NRK people
Norwegian television executives
20th-century Norwegian politicians